Front Line Defenders, or The International Foundation for the Protection of Human Rights Defenders, is an Irish-based human rights organisation founded in Dublin, Ireland in 2001 to protect those who work non-violently to uphold the human rights of others as outlined in the Universal Declaration of Human Rights.

History
The organisation was founded by Mary Lawlor, former director of the Irish Section of Amnesty International with a US$3 million donation from businessman and philanthropist Denis O'Brien. Front Line Defenders has Special Consultative Status with the United Nations Economic and Social Council, and has Observer Status with the African Commission on Human and Peoples' Rights.

In 2006 Front Line Defenders established a European Union office in Brussels.

Front Line Defenders received the King Baudouin International Development Prize in 2007 and the United Nations Prize in the Field of Human Rights in 2018. On 3 July 2014, Lawlor was presented with the Order of Chevalier of the Legion of Honour by French Ambassador to Ireland, Mr Jean-Pierre Thebault, on behalf of the French government.

Front Line Defenders' overall goal is to enable human rights defenders, as key agents of social change, to continue their work without the risk of harassment, intimidation or arrest.

Notable work
In October 2021, Front Line Defenders found evidence that various Palestinian citizens belonging to human rights groups which had been outlawed by Israel, had been targeted by spyware made by the Israeli technology company, NSO Group.

Front Line Defenders Award for Human Rights Defenders at Risk

In 2005 this award was established, which according to the organisations website is awarded to a human rights defender  "who through non-violent work,  is  courageously making an outstanding contribution to the promotion and protection of the human rights of others, often at great personal risk to themselves". The award brings international attention to its recipient's cause, and a  cash prize.

The recipients of this award since its inception are as follows:
2005 – Mudawi Ibrahim Adam, Sudan
2006 – Ahmadjan Madmarov, Uzbekistan   
2007 – Gégé Katana, Democratic Republic of Congo
2008 – Anwar al-Bunni, Syria
2009 – Yuri Melini, Guatemala
2010 – Soraya Rahim Sobhrang, Afghanistan
2011 – Joint Mobile Group, Russian Federation
2012 – Razan Ghazzawi, Syria
2013 – Biram Dah Abeid, Mauritania
2014 – SAWERA – Society for Appraisal and Women Empowerment in Rural Areas, Pakistan
2015 – Guo Feixiong, pen name for Yang Maodong, China
2016 – Ana Mirian Romero, Honduras
2017 – Emil Kurbedinov, Crimea
2018 – Nurcan Baysal, Turkey
2019 – Ibu Shinta Ratri, Indonesia
2020 – 
2021 – 
2022 – Liah Ghazanfar Jawad, Afghanistan; Ameira Osman Hamid, Sudan; Amalgamated Rural Teachers Union of Zimbabwe (ARTUZ), Zimbabwe; Javier del Tránsito and María del Tránsito Salvatierra, Mexico; Volha Harbunova, Belarus

See also
List of human rights organisations

References

External links

International Human Rights Funders Group

Human rights organisations based in Ireland
Imprisonment and detention
Organizations established in 2001
International human rights organizations